The UIM-ABP Aquabike World Championship is a powerboating sports competition. The UIM-ABP Aquabike World Championship is the premier class of jetski racing, founded in 1992. Aquabike jetskis are personal watercraft vehicles purpose-built for racing and modified according to class.   The UIM-ABP Aquabike World Championship is organized and promoted by H2O Racing Ltd on behalf of the  Union Internationale Motonautique (UIM), the governing body of powerboating and the exclusive entity recognized by the International Olympic Committee (IOC).  ABP refers to Aquabike Promotion.

Types of Bikes 
Currently, there are two types of Aquabikes (jetskis); Ski and Runabout

Ski 
This term refers to an Aquabike designed to be stood upon and is powered by rear jet propulsion with a completely closed system. Skis, by definition, are the most demanding to ride as they require high fitness levels and great physical strength as well as agility in the legs and arms. According to the different degrees of modifications to the engine and bodywork, this type of Aquabike is used for 3 different categories: GP1, GP2 and Stock. Another category (GP3) also exists in which younger drivers, between the ages of 11-14, compete.

Ski bikes are also used in the Freestyle category however this requires further structural changes to the size and motor, allowing the Ski to become considerably shorter in length, lighter in weight and able to perform better at low engine speeds.

Ski bikes are currently used in 3 different disciplines of the UIM-ABP Aquabike World Championship: Closed Circuit, Parallel Slalom and Freestyle.

Runabout 

Runabout refers to the largest and most powerful bikes in the Championship. Runabout bikes are designed for driving while seated and feature a saddle (located towards the front) and a rear jet or a completely closed propulsion system. Runabouts are the most common jetski in the world, as they can also be used for recreational purposes.

As with Ski bikes, Runabout bikes are used for 3 different racing categories: GP1, GP2 and Stock, according to the different degrees of modifications to the engine and bodywork. Another category (GP3) also exists in which younger drivers, between the ages of 11-14, compete.

Runabout bikes are used in 5 different disciplines of the UIM-ABP Aquabike World Championship: Closed Circuit, Offshore, Endurance, Jet Raid and Parallel Slalom.

Disciplines 
The UIM-ABP Aquabike World Championship is divided into 5 categories:

Closed Circuit 
These races are held near coastlines. Regulations require that the path does not exceed 1300m in length. The circuit is marked out by different coloured buoys: yellow (right turn) and red (left turn). Riders are required to complete a set number of laps (varies according to racing division) at the end of which, the chequered flag is waved by marshals.

Offshore 
Offshore races take place at sea. These races are held across long distances and require serious consideration to be taken for refuelling as this is usually done on land. The circuit is bordered by large buoys (visible from long distances) or by natural landmarks like coastline, lighthouses, islands, rocks, etc .

Endurance 
Endurance races are held on long closed circuits. As endurance races are testing the long-term resistance of a rider and their bike, these races tend to last several hours and are more akin to a marathon as opposed to a sprint. Given the long duration of the race, supplies are required in advance to ensure everything runs smoothly. Runabout bikes are used in endurance races.

Jet Raid 
These races are spread over several stages. Riders are required to travel long distances marked by checkpoints in order to complete the race. These races are often very time consuming as riders cover one expanse of water, and reach the coast on the other side, where their bike then has to be transported by land to the next race stage.

Freestyle 
This category is more of a competition than a race. Riders are given a duration of 3 minutes to perform a rehearsed routine, one at a time. The stunts are evaluated by a team of five expert judges. The evaluation criteria are: quality, quantity and variety. The most common moves are Backflip, Barrel Roll, 360, Superman and Submarine.

Safety 
Safety and security is of paramount importance during all the races and tests. Each member of the rescue team present at all races is required to have a certificate proving their ability to rescue and transport personal watercraft and injured riders. The support of the firefighters and patrol boats is essential as they ensure the immediate action in case of more serious accidents. On the ground, there is a medical team specialised in traumatology who are able to accompany the riders to the closest hospital to the race site. In offshore racing, there is also a helicopter rescue service.

Results

Runabout GP1

Ski GP1

Ski Ladies

Freestyle

See also
Motorboat racing
Offshore powerboat racing

References

External links
 Aquabike World Championship
ChampBoat Series
UIM

Aquabike
Personal water craft